Svetla Nikolova Durchova (born 24 October 1960) is a Bulgarian rower. She competed in the women's coxed four event at the 1988 Summer Olympics.

References

External links
 

1960 births
Living people
Bulgarian female rowers
Olympic rowers of Bulgaria
Rowers at the 1988 Summer Olympics
People from Razlog
Sportspeople from Blagoevgrad Province